Maggioni is an Italian surname. Notable people with the surname include:

Enrico Maggioni (born 1946), Italian cyclist
Michela Maggioni (born 1988), Italian fashion model
Roberto Maggioni (born 1968), Italian former cyclist
Rosane Maggioni (born 1992), Brazilian volleyball player

Italian-language surnames